The 1981–82 Allsvenskan was the 48th season of the top division of Swedish handball. 12 teams competed in the league. HK Drott won the regular season, but IK Heim won the playoffs and claimed their sixth Swedish title. Redbergslids IK were relegated.

League table

Playoffs

Semifinals
Ystads IF–IK Heim 23–25, 21–22 (IK Heim advance to the finals)
HK Drott–Västra Frölunda IF 26–27, 20–19, 28–23 (HK Drott advance to the finals)

Finals
HK Drott–IK Heim 22–30, 21–23 (IK Heim champions)

References 

Swedish handball competitions